Michael Durant (born 12 February 1983) is a South African-born Namibian cricketer. He was a right-handed batsman and a right-arm offbreak bowler. He was a part of the Namibian cricket team at the 2002 Under-19 Cricket World Cup.

He later represented Namibia during a tour of Zimbabwe in 2004, appearing as a tailending batsman. Durandt made his first-class debut against North West in October 2007.

External links
Michael Durant at CricketArchive 

1983 births
Namibian cricketers
Living people
People from Nama Khoi Local Municipality
Namibian people of South African descent